Caibaté is a municipality of the state of Rio Grande do Sul, Brazil. The population is 4,823 (2020 est.) in an area of 259.66 km². The name comes from the Tupi language.  It is located 524 km west of the state capital of Porto Alegre, northeast of Alegrete.

Bounding municipalities

Mato Queimado
Guarani das Missões
Vitória das Missões
São Luiz Gonzaga
Rolador

References

External links
https://web.archive.org/web/20070927224212/http://www.citybrazil.com.br/rs/caibate/ 

Municipalities in Rio Grande do Sul